Wanin International Headquarters, is an under-construction, 28-storey skyscraper office building located in Xitun District, Taichung, Taiwan. Construction of the building began in June 2022. Upon completion in 2025, the building will serve as the new headquarters for Wanin International, a Taiwanese video game developer based in Taichung.

See also 
 List of tallest buildings in Taiwan
 List of tallest buildings in Taichung

References

Skyscraper office buildings in Taichung
Buildings and structures under construction in Taiwan